The 2020–21 BC Žalgiris season is the 77th season in the existence of the club. The club has been playing in the Betsafe-LKL, King Mindaugas Cup and the EuroLeague.

Overview 
During the off-season, Šarūnas Jasikevičius left Žalgiris after four and a half seasons as a head coach of the team, signing for FC Barcelona. Subsequently, assistant coaches Darius Maskoliūnas and Tomas Masiulis, together with athletic coach Justinas Grainys, followed him to Barcelona. Players K. C. Rivers, Edgaras Ulanovas, and Zach LeDay signed with other EuroLeague teams.  An 18-year-old Marek Blaževič was bought out from Žalgiris local rivals Rytas, signing for three years, although their Estonian prospect Kerr Kriisa decided to pursue his career in the USA college basketball. Lithuanian trio, Laurynas Birutis, Arnas Velička, and Gytis Masiulis left the club after playing mainly out on loan, with their contracts not being renewed. New arrivals included big man duo Augustine Rubit and Joffrey Lauvergne, both signed for one year contract, guard Steve Vasturia signed for a two-year contract (with a possible extension for another year), and swingman Patricio Garino. Žalgiris youth product Tomas Dimša returned to the team after five years, signing a two-year contract (with a possible extension for another year), but was loaned out shortly afterward.

Players

Depth chart

Transactions

Players in

|}

Players out

|}
Notes:
 1 On loan during the 2020–21 season.

Players out on loan

|}

Club

Technical staff 

Source:

Pre-season games

Competitions

Overview

Betsafe-LKL

Regular season

Results summary

Results by round

Matches

Playoffs

EuroLeague

Regular season

Results summary

Results by round

Matches

King Mindaugas Cup

The 2021 King Mindaugas Cup was 6th instance of the tournament presented to public on 1 December 2015, to replace the LKF Cup and the LKL All-Star Day. Final Four tournament was held in Cido arena, Panevėžys. Due to COVID-19 pandemic, this tournament, for the first time in its history, was held without spectators. Žalgiris retained the King Mindaugas Cup title, defeating Lietkabelis 76:69 after a strong 4th quarter performance. Thomas Walkup led the way for the champions. He scored 18 points, dished out 8 assists, stole the ball 5 times, and collected 26 efficiency score. Although, Joffrey Lauvergne received the tournament MVP award. He lit up Neptūnas basket with 28 points and scored 11 against Lietkabelis.

Individual awards

References

External links
 BC Žalgiris official website
 BC Žalgiris at the Betsafe-LKL
 BC Žalgiris at the EuroLeague

BC Žalgiris
Kauno Žalgiris
Kauno Žalgiris
Kauno Žalgiris